Michelle Franssen (born 14 December 1994) is a Belgian Paralympic swimmer who competes in international level events. She was a finalist in three of her events at the 2016 Summer Paralympics.

References

1994 births
Living people
Sportspeople from Ostend
Paralympic swimmers of Belgium
Belgian female backstroke swimmers
Belgian female breaststroke swimmers
Belgian female butterfly swimmers
Belgian female freestyle swimmers
Belgian female medley swimmers
Swimmers at the 2016 Summer Paralympics
S14-classified Paralympic swimmers
21st-century Belgian women